The 2007 Sobeys Slam was held from November 29 to December 2 at the John Brother MacDonald Stadium in New Glasgow, Nova Scotia. It was the fourth of five women's Grand Slam events during the 2007–08 season. It was the first season where the event was a Slam. The total purse was $54,000 with $14,000 going to the champion Sherry Middaugh rink.

Sherry Middaugh won her first Grand Slam event by defeating Marie-France Larouche 6–4 in the final. Middaugh lost her first two games before racking off seven straight wins to claim the title. Larouche went undefeated up until the final before losing to Middaugh.

Teams
The teams are listed as follows:

Knockout brackets

Source:

A Event

B Event

C Event

Knockout results
All draw times listed in Atlantic Time (UTC−03:00).

Draw 1
Thursday, November 29, 8:30 am

Draw 2
Thursday, November 29, 12:00 pm

Draw 3
Thursday, November 29, 4:00 pm

Draw 4
Thursday, November 29, 7:30 pm

Draw 5
Friday, November 30, 8:30 am

Draw 6
Friday, November 30, 12:00 pm

Draw 7
Friday, November 30, 4:00 pm

Draw 8
Friday, November 30, 7:30 pm

Draw 9
Saturday, December 1, 8:30 am

Draw 10
Saturday, December 1, 11:30 am

Draw 11
Saturday, December 1, 4:30 pm

Draw 12
Saturday, December 1, 7:30 pm

Playoffs

Quarterfinals
Sunday, December 2, 8:00 am

Semifinals
Sunday, December 2, 11:00 am

Final
Sunday, December 2, 2:00 pm

References

External links
CurlingZone

2007 in Canadian curling
2007 in Nova Scotia
November 2007 sports events in Canada
2007 in women's curling
New Glasgow, Nova Scotia
Curling in Nova Scotia